MSHS may refer to:

 MacGregor State High School, a high school in Brisbane, Queensland, Australia
 Mackay State High School, a high school in Mackay, Queensland, Australia
 Manila Science High School, a high school in Manila, the Philippines
 Marikina Science High School, a high school in Marikina, Philippines
 Maris Stella High School, a Catholic school in Singapore
 Marsden State High School, a secondary school in Logan, Queensland
 Melville Senior High School, a public secondary school in Perth, Western Australia
 Miami Senior High School, a public high school in Miami, Florida, United States
 Minglanilla Science High School, a high school in Minglanilla, Cebu, Philippines
 Mirrabooka Senior High School, a public secondary school in Perth, Western Australia
 Morley Senior High School, a public secondary school in Perth, Western Australia
 Mount Stromlo High School, a High school in Canberra, Australian Capital Territory
 Muntinlupa Science High School, a high school in Muntinlupa, Philippines

See also
 List of Michigan State Historic Sites